Thomas William Shaw (born 1 December 1986) is an English former footballer and first team coach at EFL League One side Lincoln City.

Shaw began his career at Rushden & Diamonds, making over 50 appearances in the Football League and Conference between 2006 and 2008. He has since had spells at Mansfield Town, Tamworth, Kidderminster Harriers and Cambridge United, Alfreton Town, before moving to Chester in 2015. Shaw returned to Tamworth in 2018. In the summer of 2018, Shaw joined Lincoln City as the Lead PDP Coach.

Club career
Born in Nottingham, Nottinghamshire, Shaw began his career in the youth academy at Nottingham Forest before joining the youth team at Rushden & Diamonds in 2002. He joined Rugby Town on a work-experience loan in March 2006, was recalled by Rushden & Diamonds at the beginning of April, and made his debut for Rushden & Diamonds in the club's last game in the Football League against Barnet in May 2006. After Rushden & Diamonds were relegated from the Football League at the end of the 2005–06 season, he was retained by manager Paul Hart and signed full professional terms in July 2006.

By January 2007, Shaw had made 18 appearances for Rushden & Diamonds but was one of seven players placed on the transfer list by new manager Graham Westley and he joined Conference North side Nuneaton Borough on loan later in the same month. After returning from loan, he made some impressive performances until he suffered a foot injury in April 2007 that ruled him out for the remainder of the season. He signed a new two-year contract with Rushden & Diamonds in the summer of 2007.

Shaw made 35 appearances in the 2007–08 season but his contract was cancelled by mutual consent in July 2008 after both the club and Shaw felt that he would not have a regular place in the first team in the 2008–09 season.

On 8 August 2008, Shaw signed a one-year contract with Mansfield Town. Shaw joined Conference North side Tamworth on 9 October 2008. On 11 June 2010, Shaw signed a one-year deal at Kidderminster Harriers. On 14 May 2011, Shaw signed a two-year contract for Cambridge United, becoming their first signing of the summer under Jez George.

Shaw joined Alfreton Town on a two-year contract on 1 July 2013. He made his debut in Alfreton's opening day defeat to Dartford on 10 August and scored his first goal three days later in a 3–1 win over Kidderminster Harriers.

International career
Shaw represented England C in victories over Malta under-21s and Poland under-23s in 2009.

Coaching career
In 2014, Shaw was appointed Academy Lead Coach at  Nottingham Forest. The following year, he joined Derby County in the same role. Shaw departed from Derby in September 2017.

Shaw served as Player/Assistant Manager at Chester from 2015 to 2018.

In June 2018, Shaw was appointed lead PDP Coach at Lincoln City. Upon his appointment, former Academy manager Damian Froggatt described Shaw as the “standout candidate”.  

In April 2021 Shaw was appointed head coach of Gainsborough Trinity, whilst retaining his role at Lincoln City. On 12 May 2022, Shaw resigned as Trinity manager.

On 27 June 2022, Shaw was promoted to the Lincoln City first team staff from the academy and would be mentored by incoming assistant head coach Mike Garrity.

Career statistics

Honours
Tamworth
 Conference North: 2008–09

References

External links

1986 births
Living people
Footballers from Nottingham
English footballers
England semi-pro international footballers
Association football midfielders
Nottingham Forest F.C. players
Rushden & Diamonds F.C. players
Rugby Town F.C. players
Nuneaton Borough F.C. players
Mansfield Town F.C. players
Tamworth F.C. players
Kidderminster Harriers F.C. players
Cambridge United F.C. players
Alfreton Town F.C. players
Chester F.C. players
Southern Football League players
English Football League players
National League (English football) players
Gainsborough Trinity F.C. managers